Shurab (also Romanized as Shūrāb and Shūr Āb) is a village in Rahjerd-e Sharqi Rural District, Salafchegan District, Qom County, Qom Province, Iran. At the 2006 census, its population was 41, in 14 families.

References 

Populated places in Qom Province